Hans Hateboer (born 9 January 1994) is a Dutch professional footballer who plays as a right-back for  club Atalanta and the Netherlands national team. 

A Groningen youth product, Hateboer spent three-and-a-half Eredivisie seasons with the club before joining Italian club Atalanta in 2017. In February 2020, he scored the first goal in a UEFA Champions League knockout-phase match for the club.

Club career

Groningen
A product of the Groningen academy, Hateboer made his professional debut on 18 January 2014 in a match against RKC Waalwijk. During the match, which ended in a 1–1 draw, he made an assist and was later sent off. On 19 February 2014, Hateboer signed a three-year contract extension, which entered into force retroactively on 1 February 2014. In the final of the play-offs for European football, he scored a decisive goal against AZ. During the 2013–14 season, he had developed from an amateur player from the youth teams to a starting caliber player in the Groningen team. The following season, 2014–15, Hateboer was part of the team that won its first major trophy, the KNVB Cup which qualified the team for the UEFA Europa League.

In the final year of his deal, Hateboer made it clear that his intention was to leave on a Bosman at the end of the season, which meant that Groningen sold him to Atalanta in the January transfer window rather than lose him for nothing in the summer. When he left Groningen in January 2017 Hateboer had been credited with the most assists for a defender in the Eredivisie that season.

Atalanta
Having arrived in the middle of an unusually successful season for Atalanta, Hateboer was initially a substitute for Andrea Conti, a starting line-up player in the right wingback position of a 3–4–3 formation. Hateboer made his debut for Atalanta on 19 March 2017, during a 3–0 league win at home over Pescara in which he made an assist. In the 2017–18 season, after Conti transferred to Milan in the summer, he established himself as a regular starter for the team, and also played in the Europa League for the second time in his career. The following season was even more successful season for Hateboer, as he appeared in all matches in the Serie A and scored five goals in the competition. It was also a strong season for Atalanta, as the club finished third in the league and qualified for the UEFA Champions League for the first time in club history.

In 2019–20, Hateboer made his debut in the Champions League in a 4–0 loss to Dinamo Zagreb. On 19 February 2020, he scored his first goal in the competition, which was followed by his second, in a 4–1 win over Valencia in the round of 16. His first goal of the match was also the first goal of Atalanta in the knock-out phase of the Champions League.

In August 2021, Hateboer suffered a foot injury during practice, ruling him out for several months. He made his return to the pitch on 30 November as a starter in a 4–0 win in the domestic league over Venezia.

International career
In March 2018, Hateboer earned his first call up to the Netherlands national team for friendlies against England and Portugal. It was the first squad chosen by newly appointed manager Ronald Koeman.

Hateboer made his full international debut starting the international friendly against England on 23 March 2018 at the Amsterdam
arena. He then made his first appearance for the Netherlands in almost three years against Poland in a home 1–0 win in the UEFA Nations League on 4 September 2020. He delivered an impressive performance, including an assist for Bergwijn's winning goal.

Style of play
A right-back with a remarkable physique and pace, Hateboer has also occasionally been employed as a centre-back. While in Italy, he gained the nickname cavallo pazzo meaning "mad horse", due to his work rate and untiring runs.

Career statistics

Club

International

Honours
Groningen
KNVB Cup: 2014–15

References

External links

Profile at the Atalanta B.C. website
Netherlands Profile at OnsOranje

1994 births
Living people
People from Oldambt (municipality)
Dutch footballers
Association football fullbacks
Netherlands international footballers
Netherlands under-21 international footballers
Netherlands youth international footballers
Eredivisie players
Serie A players
SC Veendam players
FC Groningen players
Atalanta B.C. players
Dutch expatriate footballers
Dutch expatriate sportspeople in Italy
Expatriate footballers in Italy
Footballers from Groningen (province)